The 2022 Leinster Senior Football Championship Final was played at Croke Park in Dublin on 28 May 2022. It was contested by Dublin and Kildare. Dublin won a 12th consecutive title.

Match details

Notes

References

2L Final
Leinster Senior Football Championship Finals
Dublin county football team matches
Kildare county football team matches